The 2019–20 Alabama State Hornets basketball team represented Alabama State University in the 2019–20 NCAA Division I men's basketball season. The Hornets, led by 15th-year head coach Lewis Jackson, played their home games at the Dunn–Oliver Acadome in Montgomery, Alabama as members of the Southwestern Athletic Conference. They finished the season 8–24, 7–11 in SWAC play to finish in seventh place. They lost in the first round of the SWAC tournament to Southern.

Previous season
The Hornets finished the 2018–19 season 12–19 overall, 9–9 in SWAC play, to finish in 6th place. In the SWAC tournament, they upset Jackson State in the quarterfinals, before losing to Texas Southern in the semifinals.

Roster

Schedule and results

|-
!colspan=12 style=| Non-conference regular season

|-
!colspan=9 style=| SWAC regular season

|-
!colspan=12 style=| SWAC tournament
|-

|-

Source

References

Alabama State Hornets basketball seasons
Alabama State Hornets
Alabama State Hornets basketball
Alabama State Hornets basketball